Omri Haim Katz (born May 30, 1976) is a retired American actor. His television and film credits include Eerie Indiana, Matinee, Adventures in Dinosaur City, Hocus Pocus, and the soap opera Dallas.

Biography
Katz was born and raised in Los Angeles, California, to Israeli-Jewish immigrants Rina and Yoram Katz. He has an older brother named Michael and an older sister named Lali. Katz also was a hairdresser. Katz resided in Israel for a year during his childhood.

In 2015, it was reported Katz stays in touch with his Hocus Pocus co-stars. As of February 2022, Katz operated a cannabis company.

Filmography

Awards 
1984 – Soap Opera Digest Award Outstanding Youth Actor in a Prime-Time Soap Opera for Dallas.

References

External links 

1976 births
Male actors from Los Angeles
American male child actors
American male film actors
American male television actors
American people of Israeli descent
Jewish American male actors
Living people
20th-century American male actors
21st-century American male actors
21st-century American Jews